Slavery on the Barbary Coast (see Barbary slave trade) was a form of unfree labour which existed between the 16th and 18th centuries in the Barbary Coast area of North Africa.

According to Robert Davis, between 1 million and 1.25 million Europeans were captured by Barbary pirates and sold as slaves in North Africa and The Ottoman Empire between the 16th and 19th centuries. However, these estimates have been challenged by other historians, such as David Earle, author of The Corsairs of Malta and Barbary and The Pirate Wars.

From bases on the Barbary coast, North Africa, the Barbary pirates raided ships traveling through the Mediterranean and along the northern and western coasts of Africa, plundering their cargo and enslaving the people they captured. From at least 1500, the pirates also conducted raids along seaside towns of Italy, Spain, France, England, the Netherlands and as far away as Iceland, capturing men, women and children. On some occasions, settlements such as Baltimore, Ireland were abandoned following the raid, only being resettled many years later. Between 1609 and 1616, England alone had 466 merchant ships lost to Barbary pirates.

Barbary Wars
Commercial ships from the United States of America were subject to pirate attacks. In 1783, the United States made peace with, and gained recognition from, the British monarchy. In 1784, the first American ship was seized by pirates from Morocco. By late 1793, a dozen American ships had been captured, goods stripped and everyone enslaved. After some serious debate, the US created the United States Navy in March 1794.

This new military presence helped to stiffen American resolve to resist the continuation of tribute payments, leading to the two Barbary Wars along the North African coast: the First Barbary War from 1801 to 1805 and the Second Barbary War in 1815. Payments in ransom and tribute to the Barbary states had amounted to 20% of United States government annual revenues in 1800. It was not until 1815 that naval victories ended tribute payments by the United States. Some European nations continued annual payments until the 1830s. The white slave trade and markets in the Mediterranean declined and eventually disappeared after the European occupations.

Slave narratives 
In comparison to North American and Caribbean slave narratives, the North African slave narratives in English were written by British and American white slaves captured (often at sea or through Barbary pirates) and enslaved in North Africa in the 18th and early 19th centuries. These narratives have a distinct form in that they highlight the "otherness" of the Muslim slave traders, whereas the African-American slave narratives often call slave traders to account as fellow Christians.

Narratives focused on the central themes of freedom and liberty which drew inspiration from the American Revolution. Since the narratives include the recurrence of themes and events, quoting, and relying heavily upon each other it is believed by scholars that the main source of information was other narratives more so than real captivities. Female captives were depicted as Gothic fiction characters clinging to the hope of freedom thus more relatable to the audience.

Examples include:

A True and Faithful Account of the Religion and Manners of the Mahometans by Joseph Pitts (1663–1735) tells his capture as a boy age 14 or 15 by pirates while fishing off Newfoundland. His sale as a slave and his life under three different masters in North Africa, and his travels to Mecca are all described.
Tyrkja-Gudda, 1952 and 2001
Thomas Pellow, The History of the Long Captivity and Adventures of Thomas Pellow, In South Barbary, 1740
A Curious, Historical and Entertaining Narrative of the Captivity and almost unheard of Sufferings and Cruel treatment of Mr Robert White, 1790
A Journal of the Captivity and Suffering of John Foss; Several Years a Prisoner in Algiers, 1798
History of the Captivity and Sufferings of Mrs Maria Martin who was six years a slave in Algiers; two of which she was confined in a dismal dungeon, loaded with irons, by the command of an inhuman Turkish officer. Written by herself. To which is added, a concise history of Algiers, with the manners and customs of the people, 1812
Captain James Riley, Sufferings in Africa, 1815 
The Narrative of Robert Adams, An American Sailor who was wrecked on the West Coast of Africa in the year 1810; was detained Three Years in Slavery by the Arabs of the Great Desert, 1816
James Leander Cathcart, The Captives, Eleven Years a Prisoner in Algiers, published in 1899, many years after his captivity

See also
 Turkish Abductions
 Barbary slave trade
 Jan Janszoon

References

External links
 Barbary Slavery Discussion

North Africa
Slavery in Morocco
Slavery in Algeria
Slavery in Tunisia
Slavery in Libya
Barbary slave trade